Əfətli (or Meshadilyar) is a village and municipality in the Agdam District of Azerbaijan. It has a population of 2,322.  The municipality consists of the villages of Əfətli, Hacıməmmədli, Məmmədbağırlı, Qəhrəmanbəyli, Həsənxanlı, İsalar, and Küdürlü.

References 

Populated places in Aghdam District